Ernest Adolf Wolf (February 2, 1889 – May 23, 1964) was a professional baseball pitcher. He pitched in one game in Major League Baseball for the Cleveland Naps on September 10 during the 1912 Cleveland Naps season.

External links

Major League Baseball pitchers
Cleveland Naps players
Anderson Electricians players
Baseball players from Newark, New Jersey
1889 births
1964 deaths